Bad Münstereifel-Arloff station is a railway station in the Arloff district of the municipality of Bad Münstereifel, located in the Euskirchen district in North Rhine-Westphalia, Germany.

References

Railway stations in North Rhine-Westphalia
Buildings and structures in Euskirchen (district)
Railway stations in Germany opened in 1890
1890 establishments in Prussia